Berlin-Wilhelmsruh (in German S-Bahnhof Berlin-Wilhelmsruh) is a railway station in the neighbourhood of Reinickendorf right adjacent to the locality of Wilhelmsruh, in the city of Berlin, Germany. Until the 1938 administrative border shift the station happened to be within the boundaries of Wilhelmsruh. It is served by the Berlin S-Bahn and a local bus. The reconnection of the station with the Berlin–Groß Schönebeck Railway is planned.

History
The station was opened on 10 July 1877 under the name Rosenthal Station and served to develop the town Rosenthal. Initially it was a demand stop point for the suburban traffic between Gesundbrunnen and Oranienburg. This was then called "bus traffic".

As a result of the increase in suburban traffic, the single-track northern runway in the soft image of Berlin has increasingly become a bottleneck. Between 1887 and 1888 "the KED [Royal Railway Directorate] Berlin set up new, only operational purposes [!] Serving intersection stations: at [!] Reinickendorf (Rosenthaler road) ..." To change the timetable on 1 June 1891, the northern run between Gesundbrunnen and Oranienburg has been double-tracked. At this time, the station is called Reinickendorf (Rosenthaler road). However, from the time before 1883, other names handed down: Reinickendorf-Rosenthalerstraße and road to Rosenthal. In the Official Journal of the Royal Railway Directorate Berlin from 1883, the following stations are called: "... Pankow 4.70 km, Schönholz 5.90 km, Reinickendorf 7.40 km, Dalldorf 10.25 km ..." (Distances from Szczecin Railway Station) - presumably there is only a confusion here. The "Timetable of the Berlin Northern Railway" of 10 July 1877 indicates the order of the stations with Prinzen-Allee, Reinickendorf, Rosenthal and Dalldorf.

Since 1 October 1891 the breakpoint has become a regular stop, having previously been regarded as a request stop. After an order of the Royal Railway Directorate Berlin of 18 March 1893, the station was renamed Reinickendorf-Rosenthal.

On 30 April 1899, the so-called road to Rosenthal at the station was named Kopenhagener Strasse.

The continued increase in passenger numbers on suburban trains (in 1907 there were 7.05 million) made the four-track extension of the northern railway, separated for long-distance and suburban traffic, also north of the station Schönholz-Reinickendorf required. The track was laid on a dam to allow a level-crossing of the road traffic. The work between Reinickendorf-Rosenthal and Wittenau began in 1908. "The completely new suburban stations in Reinickendorf-Rosenthal, ... were put into operation on 20 December 1910 .... Their platforms had now the usual height of 76 cm above the rails on the suburban railways ... Special reception buildings were not built on these stations, but again arranged under well-established pattern under and between the tracks reception halls, which received all necessary facilities for the handling of suburban travelers " .[1]

This gave the station its classic Berlin S-Bahn face, which it retains until the 21st century. An access building was only erected on the southern platform, towards Copenhagen Street. The two entrances point parallel to the road towards Wilhelmsruh and towards Reinickendorf.

From 1924 to 1960, the station had a connection to the Berlin tram, which joined Reinickendorf with Wilhelmsruh.

On 5 June 1925 the suburban line from Gesundbrunnen to Birkenwerder was electrified and recorded the electric train operation with initially three "electric train pairs". The term rapid-transit railway was introduced only some years later.

In 1929, the number of departing travelers increased from 1,180,000 to 1,682,000 compared to the years 1912/13.

On 3 October 1937 the station received its present name: Berlin-Wilhelmsruh. At that time, the district Wilhelmsruh belonged to the district of Berlin Reinickendorf. This changed only in 1938 by a territorial exchange between Pankow and Reinickendorf.

The railway station also represented the junction of two abandoned branches of the Prussian Northern Railway and the Heidekraut Railway. Due to its position outside the Wall (in Reinickendorf), from 1961 to 1989 the S-Bahn station was usable only for West Berlin, at the southern entrance. The Heidekraut rail terminal was instead moved to Rosenthal station, now abandoned.

While in the context of dismantling after the end of the Second World War in the summer of 1945, the second mainline railway track of the Northern Railway was removed, kept the S-Bahn station both tracks of the suburban line. The second S-Bahn track was located north of the station to Borgsdorf. The interrupted at the end of the war suburban traffic on the northern railway was resumed between 6 and 11 June 1945, first with two train pairs pulled back. From 18 August 1945 electric S-Bahn trains could again run via Berlin-Wilhelmsruh every hour, first to Berlin-Hermsdorf. From 19 November 1945, the S-Bahn operation to Wilhelmsruh was again double-tracked, but due to lack of crossing possibilities only at 30-minute intervals on the northern section of track. Only from 9 May 1946 was a 20-minute interval again offered.

Long-distance and freight traffic on the northern runway at Wilhelmsruh station became more difficult as a result of the politically increasingly pronounced border. When the Deutsche Reichsbahn took over the operation of the Niederbarnimer railway on 1 July 1950, it passed its trains via the (private) Wilhelmsruh station and the siding to the Schönholz freight depot on the Nordbahn railway to the station in Szczecin, which initially relieved the pressure on the S-Bahn. Railways trains led. For the timetable change on 18 May 1952, passenger traffic was set on the Berlin part of the Northern Railway, since the Szczecin station was closed. The heather path ended again in Wilhelmsruh. From September 1950, the northern freight yard Hermsdorf was no longer allowed to be served (as before) from Oranienburg, but only from Schönholz.
While in this time the (at station Wilhelmsruh passing) long-distance traffic fell away, the use of the S-Bahn increased massively.

Since 1953 also run on the northern railway on weekdays so-called run-through trains of the S-Bahn, which did not stop at the stations of the western sectors. For various members of state enterprises the exit and later the passage of the Western sectors was forbidden "for security reasons". On the northern railway, two trains every morning from Oranienburg travel back in the city and in the evening. The runners reversed until 3 May 1958. Thereafter, they were replaced by locomotive-hauled trains between Oranienburg and the station Lichtenberg or Ostbahnhof (the S-Bahn connection Hohen Neuendorf - Blankenburg on the Berlin outer ring (BAR) was only on 9 November Put into operation in 1961).

Since 1948, a 20-minute interval train service was offered during the day, the mid-1950s no longer met the requirements. The German Reichsbahn therefore tried to establish a 10-minute cycle by extending the amplifier trains that ended in Schönholz to Hermsdorf. Due to the single track north of Wilhelmsruh the travel times had to be shortened for this. While on the S-Bahn routes at this time a maximum of 60 km/h was allowed, the maximum speed was increased from Schönholz to 70 km/h, between Wilhelmsruh and Waidmannslust to 80 km/h. Neither vehicles nor power supply allowed such a power increase, so the German Reichsbahn had to cancel this "experiment" on 26 May 1955 - after only four days. There followed announcements to build the track again with two tracks (first to Borgsdorf, then to Frohnau or Hermsdorf) - but nothing was realized. Previously, in April 1955, the long-distance railway line to Oranienburg in front of Birkenwerder was already interrupted. Here the curve from Birkenwerder to the Berlin outer ring was built. The timetable change on 28 May 1961 was a 10-minute cycle to Berlin-Wilhelmsruh introduced.

In 1960, the two were - last only from Reinickendorf forth to the sector border at the train station - tram lines set.

After the construction of the Berlin Wall, the S-Bahn trains (to Frohnau) continue as a train group 1 at 20-minute intervals. The location of the S-Bahn station directly on the sector border now shows significant effects, the eponymous district is out of reach to the east. For West Berlin, the station is rather uninteresting, because the nearest residential houses just under a kilometer south, and even behind the Kremmener Bahn (S-Bahn station Reinickendorf, today Alt-Reinickendorf) are.
At the end of the 1960s, a construction project by the state of Berlin (West) for the development of the Märkisches Viertel led to a change of ownership. When building a new bridge over the Schorfheidestraße (connection to the street Am Nordgraben) Although the abutments were designed for four tracks, but only two superstructures installed. Bley reports on p. 86: "Since the construction of this new bridge at the latest, the freight trains between Schönholz and Hermsdorf used to run on the S-Bahn track" - that means that a bridge superstructure was available for the mainline track but was not tracked. The remaining long-distance railway track in the area of Wilhelmsruh station was no longer used. Another bridge construction around 1975 at Wilhelmsruher dam, so at the S-Bahn station Wittenau (Northern Railway), brought no change for the described station.
 

During the strike of the West Berlin Reichsbahner the traffic rested between 17 and 28 September 1980. However, the S-Bahn traffic over Wilhelmsruh was resumed thereafter. Nearly three years later, with the takeover of the "western" S-Bahn by the BVG on 9 January 1984, the route to Frohnau and thus also the Wilhelmsruh station was shut down. The Berlin Senate had the intention to take the line to Frohnau long-term operation again. The pressure of the population led to a quick restart, so that the track and the station Wilhelmsruh on 1 October 1984 went back into operation. The line north of the station initially remained a single track and was expanded in 1986 double track to allow a 10-minute cycle. The station itself was not affected by this expansion because it was already double-tracked. From 18 August 1986 the 10-minute clock was introduced, first to Wittenau (Northern Railway), towards the end of the year to Frohnau.

The fall of the Berlin Wall initially had no effect on the station. On 7 April 1990 the Kopenhagener Straße border crossing was opened, but station access remained possible only from the south. On 31 May 1992 the gap was closed on the West Berlin city boundary between Frohnau and Hohen Neuendorf, for the station Wilhelmsruh it remained at 10-minute intervals. At the end of May 1995 an additional train group (at 20-minute intervals) was introduced,  to/from Waidmannslust. Along with a shortening of the trains to Oranienburg a situation similar to that of 1955 was created, only that one did not stop the "experiment", but tried to get a grip on it by changing the timetable. The station was renovated in 2000 and 2001, since 2001, the northern entrance is accessible again. The S-Bahn station has a lift, so it is barrier-free. The further expansion of the station and the route depend on when the planned in the Federal Transport Plan rebuilding the long-distance railway tracks, but there is still a date for this.

Heidekrautbahn
At the beginning of the 20th century, the railroad station was at the same level as the S-Bahn stop. was opened in 1901 and then steadily expanded. While between 1905 and 1906 the northern railway was laid on a dam, the station of the Heidekrautbahn remained on level ground. The transfer of passengers took place via Kopenhagener Strasse.

The actual station had two platform tracks for passenger traffic and several parking and Rangiergleise. The Rangiergleise and a siding were also usable for the goods traffic, which in turn allowed a direct connection to the Nordbahn, after its raising over a 1.57 km long ramp. Further equipment of the station included a goods shed, a loading lane with head and side ramps, two independent engine sheds as well as a coal yard and a water crane. On 14 November 1907 the track connection went to Schönholz in operation. It had become necessary due to the dam construction of the Northern Railway and replaced the direct siding with a long ramp to the elevated freight yard Schönholz-Reinickendorf (at the later station Berlin-Schönholz).

After the construction of Bergmann Elektrizitätswerke in 1907, the station also received a siding for this factory.

On 3 October 1937 the station was renamed Berlin-Wilhelmsruh (Niederbarnimer railway) (or shortened Berlin-Wilhelmsruh (NBE)). On several occasions he was also called Berlin-Wilhelmsruh (Klbf). On 21 March 1939 the small station received its own reception building.

By 1950, the station had two platform tracks, two siding to the S-Bahn embankment, six through siding east of the platform and a loading road with head and side ramp. Furthermore, two (or only one) engine shed at the northern end of the station.

From 1 July 1950 to 18 May 1952 trains of the NBE ran to the station of Szczecin and the North Station as terminus. After the closure of the North Station, the trains ended again in Berlin-Wilhelmsruh (NBE). In May 1953, a separate works station on the Lessingstrasse was opened for the power stations in the vicinity of the Heidekraut station.

After the closure of West Berlin, the construction of the Berlin Wall on 13 August 1961, the station was shut down on 9 November 1961. In 1962 it was relatively quickly razed to the ground, as it lay in the border strip. Passenger and goods traffic between Wilhelmsruh and Rosenthal was discontinued, the siding to Schönholz interrupted.

On 24 March 1962 Deutsche Reichsbahn informed the Niederbarnimer railway A.G. (based in Berlin-Wilhelmsruh, Fontanestr. 31) of the clearing of railway facilities "a) of the reception building and b) of the dike" and supplemented "The implementation of a) has already taken place. The object to b) is still in progress ".  On a photo dated 7 July 1962 the platform is still recognizable, so only the reception building on Copenhagen Street was demolished. At the same time, the photo documents the borderline: While the railway station on the embankment is already on the Pankow area, the Kopenhagener Straße, which runs at right-angles, still belongs to Reinickendorf for a few meters.

Until the construction of a rail connection for the VEB Bergmann-Borsig from the north around 1970 transfer trains with freight cars on the station Wilhelmsruh were led to the factory.

As a result of the later expansion of the border fortifications in this area, the tracks and remaining facilities of the station were cleared away, but even today remains of the station can be found among wild vegetation, such as low platform surrounds and short track rests. The connecting track to the south to the goods station Schönholz was located immediately before the border in the French sector and therefore remained (unused).

On 12 August 2011, a commemorative stele was inaugurated by the NEB at the Wilhelmsruh S-Bahn station, informing about the history and future of the Heidekrautbahn.

The Niederbarnimer Eisenbahn is planning the re-establishment of the route from the Märkisches Viertel to the station Berlin-Wilhelmsruh. Contrary to the original course, however, the station is not to be built at ground level, but in dam position at the height of the northern runway and in the form of a side platform, accessible via a ramp from the northern station forecourt and via a staircase from the Mauerweg. The trains of the Heidekrautbahn can then be led back to the station Berlin-Wilhelmsruh, with a transfer to the S-Bahn. The state of Berlin supports this project, the rebuilding is included in the urban development plan traffic. The related planning approval decision was published in early 2011. In particular, the financing of the construction work as well as an order for the associated public transport services by the states of Berlin and Brandenburg are open.

After reconstruction of the long-distance railway tracks of the Nordbahn a transition to the railway lines of the Deutsche Bahn is provided via a switch connection south of the platform. This would allow the continuation of the passenger traffic of the Heidekrautbahn to the long-distance station Berlin-Gesundbrunnen.

References

External links

Station information 

Berlin S-Bahn stations
Railway stations in Berlin
Buildings and structures in Reinickendorf
Berlin Wilhelmsruh